FC Tskhinvali is a Georgian football club, which in mid-2010s spent four seasons in the top tier of the national league.
 
Despite the name, due to the enduring Georgian–Ossetian conflict they were unable to host their opponents in the city of Tskhinvali, playing home games instead in Georgian-controlled areas, mostly in Gori, Tbilisi and Rustavi. 

In early 2020 the club was disqualified from Liga 3 after their failure to solve a severe financial crisis.

History

The original Spartaki Tskhinvali were founded in 1936, and during the time of the Soviet Union were a mainstay in the regional Georgian League, which was the fourth division in the Soviet league table. The club's biggest success came in 1987 when they won the regional Georgian Cup.  

With the creation of independent Georgian league the club changed their name into Liakhvi and played several games of the first season until being withdrawn from the competition. 

The team was restored in 2007, in an effort for the Georgian government to regain control over the break-away region of South Ossetia. Having won the second league in 2013, they were promoted to Umaglesi Liga. 

In January 2015 the team was renamed as FC Tskhinvali. In 2014/15 the club reached semifinals of the national Cup for the first time, but failed to overcome Dinamo Tbilisi (1-2 on aggregate). Their championship game four days prior to the return leg ended with Tskhinvali's sensational 4-1 victory.

In the same season under Kakha Kacharava the team reached their highest position in the league by finishing 4th and qualified for 2015–16 Europa League competition.   

Tskhinvali were relegated from Umaglesi Liga after the transitional 2016 season. For three years the team competed in the second division. After an automatic relegation they were supposed to play in Liga 3 the next year, although  unable to cope with long-standing financial difficulties, the club was expelled from the league in January 2020.

Honours 
Georgian Soviet Cup
Champion: 1987 
Pirveli Liga
Champion: 2013
Bronze medal winner: 1997, 2005

Last squad 
As of August 2019

Eurocups record

Notes
 1Q: First qualifying round

Top scorers

Managers

 Badri Kvaratskhelia (Oct 1, 2010–1?)
 Vladimer Khachidze (Sept 15, 2011 – Oct 30, 2013)
 Kakhaber Kacharava (Nov 1, 2013–)
 Gocha Chikovani ( - April 2017)
 Malkhaz Latsabidze (May 2017 - May 2018)
 Yuri Gabiskiria (June - August 2018)  
 Roberto Landi (Sep - Oct 2018)
 Malkhaz Latsabidze (Nov - Dec 2018)
 Xavier Munoz Sanchez (Mar - Jun 2019)
 Vladimer Vashadze  (Jul - Sept 2019)
 Giga Kutivadze (Oct - Dec 2019)

External links
 Page on Soccerway

References 

Football clubs in Georgia (country)
FC Tskhinvali
FC Tskhinvali